The 2011 IIHF World U18 Championships was held in Crimmitschau and Dresden, Germany. The championships ran from April 14–24, 2011.

The United States won the title for the third straight time after beating Sweden 4–3 in the final in overtime.

Top Division

Preliminary Round

Group A 

All times local (CEST/UTC+2)

Group B 

All times local (CEST/UTC+2)

Relegation round 
The results from matches between teams from the same group in the preliminary round were carried forward to this round.

Schedule
All times local (CEST/UTC+2)

Final round

Quarterfinals

5th place game

Semifinals

Bronze medal game

Final

Scoring leaders
List shows the top ten skaters sorted by points, then goals.

GP = Games played; G = Goals; A = Assists; Pts = Points; +/− = Plus/minus; PIM = Penalties In MinutesSource: IIHF.com

Leading goaltenders
Only the top five goaltenders, based on save percentage, who have played 40% of their team's minutes are included in this list.
TOI = Time on ice (minutes:seconds); SA = Shots against; GA = Goals against; GAA = Goals against average; Sv% = Save percentage; SO = ShutoutsSource: IIHF.com

Tournament Awards
 Best players selected by the directorate
Best Goalkeeper: 
Best Forward: 
Best Defenseman: 

 Best players of each team
Best players of each team selected by the coaches.

Division I 

Group A was played in Riga, Latvia between April 11 and April 17, 2011. Group B was played in Maribor, Slovenia between April 10 and April 16, 2011. On March 29, 2011 Japan withdrew from the tournament due to the 2011 Japan earthquake.

Group A

Group B

Division II 

Group A was played in Braşov, Romania between March 19 and March 25, 2011. Group B was played in Donetsk, Ukraine between March 27 and April 2, 2011.

Group A

Group B

Division III 

Group A was played in Taipei, Chinese Taipei between April 11 and April 17, 2011. Group B was played in Mexico City, Mexico between March 13 and March 20, 2011. Prior to the start of the tournament, the Mongolian national team announced they would withdraw, citing financial reasons. All games against them are to be counted as a forfeit, with a score of 5–0 for the opposing team. Group A played a round-robin schedule followed by a classification round.

Group A

Semifinals

Third place game

Advancement Game

Australia promoted to Division II

Group B

 is promoted to the Division II for the 2012 IIHF World U18 Championships.

See also
 2011 World Junior Ice Hockey Championships
 2011 World U-17 Hockey Challenge

References

External links
IIHF

 
IIHF World U18 Championships
IIHF World U18 Championships
World
2011
Sport in Dresden
Crimmitschau
April 2011 sports events in Germany